Trepča is a village in central Croatia, in the municipality of Gvozd, Sisak-Moslavina County. It is connected by the D6 highway.

History
As evidenced by the remains of a medieval church in Crkvište under the cemetery, the location was already inhabited in the Middle Ages. The village of Trepča, like many settlements in the area, grew in the late 17th century when Orthodox Serbs from Bosnia settled there. The village became a part of the Military Frontier which, at the time, was expanding onto former Ottoman territories such as Lika, Kordun, Banija and lower Slavonia.

Demographics
According to the 2011 census, the village of Trepča has 5 inhabitants. This represents 4.10% of its pre-war population according to the 1991 census.

Population by ethnicity

Notable natives and residents

References 

Populated places in Sisak-Moslavina County
Serb communities in Croatia